Antonio Cabral de Melo (1646-c.1717) was a Spanish landowner and Captain of provincial militias. He dedicated himself to the raising of cattle and agriculture, later obtaining the position of Accionero (Vaquería (caza)) of the Río de la Plata, with permission for the slaughter of the cattle cimarron.

Biography

Antonio Román Cabral de Melo y Carbajal was born in Buenos Aires, the son of Cristóbal Cabral de Melo, a nobleman born in Vila do Porto, and María de Carbajal, belonging to a distinguished family. He was baptized on March 11, 1646, being his godparents the Captain Diego Gutiérrez de Humanes and Leonor Carbajal. 

He was married to Leonor Morales, daughter of Pedro Morales y Mercado and Mariana de Manzanares. The wedding was celebrated on July 13, 1671, in the Cathedral Mayor, and attended as godparents Juan Báez de Alpoim and Gerónima Cabral, relatives of the groom.  

He possibly completed his studies at the age of 18 or 20 at the Jesuit College of the City. He was dedicated himself to the raising of livestock, horses and pigs. He also devoted himself to agriculture and viticulture. He owned a large number of haciendas, one of them was located in the center of Buenos Aires Province. 

Like most of his relatives he had an active participation in the provincial militias belonging to the Fort of Buenos Aires. He toke part in some military expeditions against the Pampas tribes. He held the position of Maestre de Campo, in charge of the provincial militias of the Spanish Army. Towards 1690 the town council authorized him to carry out the slaughter of the wild cattle that were in the jurisdiction of the province of Buenos Aires. 

The "accioneros" of the cattle of the Río de la Plata, supplied meat and leather to the city during the 17th and 18th century, and were also in charge of the export of leather through of the Compañía de Guinea de Francia and Asiento de Inglaterra until 1740. The right to the title of "accionero" was inheritable. In 1668, Cabral de Melo requested to the Ayuntamiento for permission to hunt 3000 head of cattle in the area of Luján, belonging to his mother Doña María de Carbajal. After the death of Antonio Cabral de Melo, the right to hunt cattle cimarron passed to his son-in-law Don Miguel Gerónimo de Esparza. 

After the extinction of cattle cimarron of Buenos Aires Province, the accioneros were dedicated entirely to the raising of cattle in their haciendas, trading their products with the Compañía Guipuzcoana and Compañía de Filipinas.

In 1707, Antonio Cabral de Melo, granted power to make his testament to Miguel de Riglos, personal friend of the Cabral de Melo family. He was the nephew of Manuel Cabral de Alpoim, a prominent rancher and military leader of Portuguese origin, who had an outstanding performance in the Río de la Plata, where he served as Mayor and Lieutenant of Governor of Corrientes. His maternal grandfather was the General Gonzalo Carbajal, who held various honorary positions in Buenos Aires.

References

External links
Antonio Cabral de Melo - Genealogía Familiar 

1646 births
1717 deaths
Spanish colonial governors and administrators
People from Buenos Aires
Spanish landowners
17th-century Spanish businesspeople
18th-century Spanish businesspeople
18th-century Argentine people